Harold William Hailstone (1897–1982) was a British cartoonist and illustrator, who served as an official war artist.

He was born on 14 July 1897 in London, England. His father William Edward Hailstone was a dentist. He was educated at The Judd School. During World War I he served first in the army and then as a trainee pilot in the Royal Flying Corps. He subsequently attended Goldsmiths College alongside Graham Sutherland.

His work was published in journals including the Illustrated London News, Punch, The Sketch, Strand Magazine, and Tatler.

He returned to military service immediately before and during World War II, joining the Royal Air Force from 1938 to 1945, being a flight lieutenant from 1940, and was appointed a war artist in 1944.

After the war, he was a staff cartoonist for the Daily Mirror.

In retirement he lived at Corneys Cottage, Hadlow, Kent, where he died on 21 November 1982.

Some of his works are in the collection of the Imperial War Museum.

His younger brother was the portraitist Bernard Hailstone.

Books illustrated by Hailstone 
 
 
 
 
  (dust jacket)

References

External links 

 UK National Archives catalogue entry for "Officer Cadet Harold William HAILSTONE - Royal Flying Corps"
 Imperial War Museum holdings

1897 births
1982 deaths
20th-century English artists
20th-century war artists
Artists from London
English cartoonists
English illustrators
People educated at The Judd School
Alumni of Goldsmiths, University of London
British Army personnel of World War I
British war artists
Daily Mirror people
People from Hadlow
Punch (magazine) cartoonists
Royal Air Force officers
Royal Air Force personnel of World War II
Royal Flying Corps officers
Sibling artists